The Democratic Majority for Israel (DMFI) is a centrist or left-leaning American advocacy group that supports pro-Israel policies among the United States Democratic Party's political leaders. DMFI was founded in January 2019 in reaction to polling that showed that Democrats and younger voters were less supportive of Israel than previous generations. Its president and CEO is Democratic pollster Mark Mellman, who was one of its founders, along with other Democratic Party strategists, including now-Secretary of Energy Jennifer Granholm and former White House Communications Director Ann Lewis.

DMFI's separate sister organization is the political action committee DMFI PAC, founded in July 2019. DMFI PAC backs candidates that support Democratic policies and defend Israel inside the Democratic Party. The PAC opposed Bernie Sanders in the 2020 Democratic presidential caucuses in Iowa, endorsed Joe Biden in March 2020, and has endorsed Democratic candidates in both primary and general elections across the country who align with DMFI's political stances.

2019 founding

DMFI was founded on January 29, 2019. The founding came in reaction to polling showing that Democrats and younger voters were less supportive of Israel than previous generations. Mellman and other Democratic Party strategists started the organization. In July 2019 the group formed a political action committee, DMFI PAC, which supports pro-Israel Democratic candidates.

2020 Democratic primary season 
In the months before the first contests in Iowa and New Hampshire in the 2020 Democratic Party presidential primaries, DMFI sent organizing staffers to identify pro-Israel Democrats, send volunteers to Democratic candidates' campaign events, and signal support for Israel. Mellman said 400 volunteer Democrats signed up in New Hampshire and 800 in Iowa.

DMFI PAC endorsed Joe Biden for president in March 2020 and ran online ads supporting him. Through February 2020, DMFI PAC had spent money only in Iowa. DMFI PAC endorsed more than 100 Democrats for House and Senate in the 2020 election cycle and ran attack ads opposing Bernie Sanders's candidacy during the 2020 primaries. In total, the PAC spent over $1.4 million on advertising attacking Sanders. The anti-Sanders advertising concentrated on arguing that Sanders would lose to Trump in the general election, including arguments about his "socialism" label and Sanders's recent heart attack. The Sanders campaign said that the first wave of attack ads in January led to a surge in support from Sanders supporters, with 70,000 donors collectively contributing $1.3 million to the Sanders campaign.

Journalist Jonathan S. Tobin wrote that DMFI "played a not insignificant role in helping to undermine Sanders at a point in the campaign when he was the frontrunner and Biden seemed dead in the water". Biden won the Democratic nomination with 2,687 delegates to Sanders's 1,073. In their book Lucky: How Joe Biden Barely Won the Presidency, political reporters Jonathan Allen and Amie Parnes credit DMFI PAC’s primary ads with helping Biden secure the nomination. After his election, Biden wrote to DMFI, "I am grateful for and humbled by your statement of support for this campaign." Future United States Secretary of State Antony Blinken read the letter aloud during a virtual meeting.

In the 2020 New York House election in district 15, DMFI PAC supported incumbent Eliot Engel alongside Speaker Nancy Pelosi, Majority Whip Jim Clyburn, the Congressional Black Caucus's political action committee, and AIPAC-affiliated donors against middle school principal Jamaal Bowman, who had the support of Representative Alexandria Ocasio-Cortez, Our Revolution, Democratic Socialists of America (DSA), and Senator Elizabeth Warren. DMFI PAC spent over $732,000 on leafletting, TV ads, and paid phone banking in support of Engel by June and over $1.5 million by the end of the race. The attack ads did not focus on Bowman's stance on Israel, instead highlighting that he did not pay taxes in the past. Responding later, Bowman said that he had subsequently paid his tax debt in full. Bowman won. After joining Congress, he voted to fund Israel's missile defense system, Iron Dome, traveled to Israel, and met with Prime Minister Naftali Bennett, earning condemnation and a vote to expel Bowman from the DSA, which failed.

2021 election year 
According to DMFI, 28 of its 29 candidates won their primaries in the 2021 election cycle.

DMFI PAC made an endorsement in the 2021 Ohio 11th congressional district special election, in which the front-running candidates were progressive former State Senator Nina Turner and more moderate Democratic county councilwoman Shontel Brown. The PAC endorsed Brown, citing her likely support for Israel, Turner's interest in placing conditions on U.S. aid to Israel, and Turner's lack of a statement on BDS. The endorsement came alongside other support from mainstream Democrats, including endorsements from elected officials like Representatives Jim Clyburn and Joyce Beatty. By July 2021, DMFI had spent over $660,000 in the race. Much of the advertising suggested that Turner was too divisive. In late July, DMFI released a poll of 400 likely Democratic voters that placed Brown five points behind Turner. Brown defeated Turner. By the end of the race, DMFI PAC had spent over $1 million on television ads and over $2 million total. Journalist Daniel Marans of HuffPost said that "there’s no question that DMFI played a pivotal role" in the election, which was held to replace Representative Marcia Fudge, now the U.S. Secretary of Housing and Urban Development. Jewish Insiders Matthew Kassel called Brown's win a "major victory for DMFI."

DMFI PAC spent $32,000 opposing Omari Hardy in an 11-way race for Florida's 20th congressional district special election, spending on phone banking, physical and digital ads, and a full-page ad in the free South Florida paper the Jewish Journal. DMFI PAC entered the race after Hardy shifted his position on Israel from general support in November to a new position in December of opposition to Iron Dome funding and support for BDS. Hardy received 6% of the vote in the district, losing in sixth place to now-Congresswoman Sheila Cherfilus-McCormick's 24%.

In the month before the 2020-2021 U.S. Senate special election runoff in Georgia, DMFI PAC endorsed Raphael Warnock against Republican Senator Kelly Loeffler. Warnock thanked DMFI PAC on Twitter for its endorsement, saying he would "stand for Israel’s security" and "work to strengthen the alliance between our nations". The endorsement followed DMFI PAC’s earlier endorsement of Democratic Senate candidate Jon Ossoff against Republican Senator David Perdue. Warnock and Ossoff defeated their Republican opponents in the January 5 runoffs.

2022 election year 
In May, DMFI PAC endorsee Representative Shontel Brown defeated former State Senator Nina Turner in Ohio’s 11th Congressional District in a rematch of the previous year's special election, winning 66.3% of the vote to Turner’s 33.7%. DMFI said it had spent more than $1 million to support Brown through independent expenditures this cycle. DMFI PAC was also the largest outside spender supporting Representative Sean Casten against Representative Marie Newman in Illinois's 6th congressional district. By July, it had spent over $426,000 supporting Glenn Ivey against former Representative Donna Edwards for a Maryland House seat. Ivey won. DMFI President Mark Mellman said that 85% of the candidates his organization supported in the 2022 cycle won.

In the 2022 U.S. Senate elections, the organization endorsed successfully reelected incumbents Catherine Cortez Masto and Raphael Warnock, and in an open race, Lieutenant Governor John Fetterman. DMFI PAC undertook several independent expenditure programs in support of Democrats against Trump-endorsed opponents. In Georgia, it ran print and digital ads in support of Warnock's campaign against Herschel Walker. In Pennsylvania, DMFI PAC ran a program targeting Republican nominee Mehmet Oz in support of Fetterman. DMFI PAC also ran an ad campaign targeting Madison Gesiotto Gilbert, the Republican candidate in Ohio's 13th congressional district, to support State Representative Emilia Skyes's successful general election campaign.

Political positions and other activities 
DMFI says it pushes for pro-Israel support among Democratic Party leadership, for autonomous Israeli defensive capacity, for a two-state solution to the Israeli-Palestinian conflict, for American global leadership, for progressive values, and for education of Democratic leadership. It says it opposes "efforts to isolate, stigmatize or delegitimize Israel". DMFI supports the IHRA definition of antisemitism and, before he won the presidency, called on Biden to adopt it, which he did. DMFI also backed the Nita Lowey Middle East Partnership for Peace Fund, which is intended to promote Israeli–Palestinian dialogue and support the Palestinian economy. DMFI supported the Iron Dome Supplemental Appropriations Act, which would provide Israel with $1 billion to restock its missile defense system that was depleted during the 2021 Israel–Palestine crisis. It shared social media posts highlighting Democrats' support for the bill and criticized the delay of the bill by Senator Rand Paul. DMFI President Mark Mellman said that Paul's tactics "damages the U.S.–Israel relationship". In 2022, Jacob Magid of the Times of Israel said DMFI "sits slightly to the left of AIPAC" on Israel policy.

In 2021, DMFI extended congratulations to the incoming Lapid–Bennett government alongside many Jewish and pro-Israel groups. It called the new coalition the "most inclusive government ever" politically, religiously, and ethnically. Foreign Minister Yair Lapid's first call to an American organization after assuming office was to DMFI, during which he emphasized reinvigorating Israel's ties with the Democratic Party. After Lapid became prime minister of Israel, Haaretz noted that DMFI's president and CEO Mark Mellman was Lapid's most "significant relationship in America".

In May 2021, DMFI provoked a strong negative reaction from numerous other Jewish groups after it tweeted that Nancy Kaufman, former head of the National Council for Jewish Women and a progressive suggestion for Biden's antisemitism envoy, had "enabled, rather than battled, anti-Semitism." DMFI deleted the tweet and apologized. The attack alienated a variety of groups that support strong Israel–United States relations. DMFI joined a broad range of pro-Israel and Jewish groups in lauding Biden's nomination of Deborah Lipstadt to the post in July 2021 and urged Republican senators to stop blocking her nomination.

In September 2021, Vice President Kamala Harris did not push back after a George Mason University student called Israel's actions toward Palestinians "an ethnic genocide and a displacement of people." After the exchange, Harris reached out to DMFI, the Conference of Presidents of Major American Jewish Organizations and the Anti-Defamation League. Harris's senior staff told Mellman that she "strongly disagrees with the George Mason student's characterization of Israel." Mellman expressed appreciation for Harris's outreach and the Biden administration's pro-Israel policies after this meeting.

DMFI called former president Trump's critical comments at the end of the 2022 election about the American Jewish community "insulting and ill-informed". DMFI was one of numerous organizations that called on UC Berkeley to rescind a provision that banned any speakers who support Israel or Zionism. It also praised Hakeem Jeffries's selection as House Minority Leader. The Times of Israel called Jeffries "one of the most pro-Israel Democrats in the House".

Funding 
Top donors to DMFI PAC by January 2020 included energy executive and philanthropist Stacy Schusterman, the largest single donor ($995,000), and Gary Lauder, who had donated half a million. Donations in the third and fourth quarters of 2019 totaled nearly $2.3 million. According to FEC filings, the organization Americans for Tomorrow's Future gave DMFI PAC $100,000 in the early 2020 primary season, followed by another $400,000 on June 5 and June 10.

Leadership 
Mellman and other Democratic Party strategists started DMFI. As of 2020, Archie Gottesman, a longtime advertising industry member and co-founder of JewBelong, held a DMFI board position. Other prominent leaders include Co-Chair Ann Lewis, former board member Jennifer Granholm, now the Secretary of Energy, and LGBTQ rights activist Meghan Stabler.

References

External links
 

Jewish-American political organizations
Lobbying organizations in the United States
2019 establishments in the United States
Political organizations established in 2019
501(c)(4) nonprofit organizations
Democratic Party (United States) organizations
Israel–United States relations